Rétfalu may refer to:

Rétfalu: Wiesen, Austria (in Hungarian)
Rétfalu: Retfala, Croatia (in Hungarian)
Újrétfalu: Wiesfleck, Austria (in Hungarian)